Aidan Burrell (born 3 August 2003) is an English professional rugby league footballer who last played as a  for Hull FC in the Betfred Super League.

In 2021 he made his FC debut in the Super League against the Huddersfield Giants. He is known for his solid defence and strong running.

References

External links
Hull FC profile

2003 births
Living people
English rugby league players
Hull F.C. players
Rugby league players from Kingston upon Hull
Rugby league props